The Former Ladies of the Supremes, or FLOS (now Scherrie and Susaye, Formerly of the Supremes), is a singing group that was originally formed by former Supremes members Jean Terrell, Cindy Birdsong and Scherrie Payne, in 1986, and has since included former Supremes Lynda Laurence and Susaye Greene. Though they were not Supremes members, singers Sundray Tucker, Freddi Poole and Joyce Vincent have also sung with the group alongside pairings of Supremes members Laurence, Payne and Greene, following the departure of Jean Terrell.

Biography

Early years
In early 1976, after original Supremes member Florence Ballard had passed away, it was rumored that former Supremes Jean Terrell and Cindy Birdsong had just contacted Ballard to form a new singing group, but that Ballard's sudden death would quickly cancel their plans.

In 1985, eight years after the group officially broke up in 1977, former supreme Scherrie Payne was signed to SuperStar International Records, a Los Angeles based record company. Ronnie Phillips and SuperStar approached her with the idea of reforming the Supremes, to which she agreed, and called on Birdsong and original Supreme Mary Wilson. Wilson declined, instead opting to forge a solo career, while Birdsong agreed and coaxed Terrell to join the new Supremes group.

The three of them set about forming a new incarnation of The Supremes, although due to contractual difficulties over the ownership of the name (Mary Wilson was involved in lengthy lawsuits with Motown over ownership and rights to the name) decided to create an entirely new group under the name "FLOS", The Former Ladies of the Supremes. Before the FLOS got off the ground, Birdsong left for a solo career; recording briefly for U.K. based Hi-Hat Records. Former Supreme Lynda Laurence joined the lineup, replacing Cindy Birdsong just as she had in 1972; and in 1986, the group was officially formed. The group released the song "We're Back", backed with "Getaway", as 12-inch versions. It featured all three ladies showcasing their vocals with a contemporary pop sound.  Because SuperStar International Records did not have national distribution, the song failed to chart and the label soon folded. The group began touring around this time, making their debut at The Wilshire Ebell Theatre in Los Angeles in 1987. Former Supreme Mary Wilson came along to show support to her former groupmates at this concert. Backing vocals at this concert were provided by Lynda's sister and soon-to-be group member, Sundray Tucker.

Motorcity Records
In 1989, the FLOS signed to British producer Ian Levine's Motorcity Records project, joining a roster of former Motown artists at the label. The first single by the FLOS on the new label was an original tune called "Crazy 'bout the Guy" (MOTC 13), released during that summer, and featuring Jean on lead vocals.  This single, together with all releases by the group on the Motorcity Records label ran the credit as Jean, Scherrie & Lynda Formerly of The Supremes. The follow-up single was a re-make of the classic Supremes hit "Stoned Love" (MOTC 56) which saw Scherrie and Jean splitting lead vocal duties between one another.  The single's b-side contained a live version of "Crazy 'bout the Guy". The next single was "I Want to Be Loved" (MOTC 77), showcasing the lead vocals of all three ladies; the b-side contained two remixes of the track. The final single for Motorcity, the Lynda-led "Hit & Miss" (MOTC 88), was released in 1991 and the ladies were credited as 'The Supremes'. Since then, all of their back catalogue of recordings made for Motorcity are marketed as just 'The Supremes'. The ladies also released a single with label-mates The Originals, an original tune called "Back By Popular Demand".  An album called "Bouncing Back" was scheduled to be released, but the label ran into financial difficulties before it could come to fruition. The album eventually was released by various labels.  One song scheduled for inclusion on the album was "How Do You Keep the Music Playing?" which has since become a staple of the group's live act.

Exit Jean, Enter Sundray
The FLOS' lineup changed again, when in late December 1992, Jean Terrell left and was replaced by Lynda's sister Sundray Tucker.  Sundray made her concert debut with the group in March 1993 when the group made another tour of the country.  Several shows from the tour were recorded but have not been released.  One track taken from this tour, "Sukiyaki", saw release on the limited edition album Something Special (produceed by Steve Weaver in 1998) which featured several tracks by the group, as well as solo tracks by both Lynda and Cindy Birdsong.

In 1994, The FLOS released their first studio album with Sundray Tucker on board. The resulting album, Supreme Voices, featured all three ladies taking lead vocal duties. Scherrie, Lynda & Sundray shared lead vocals on three songs, "Give Me the Night", a remake of the George Benson classic hit;  a remake of their 1970's Supremes hit, "Up The Ladder To The Roof", which featured guest vocals by former Supreme Cindy Birdsong; and "How Do You Keep The Music Playing".

The following year another album produced by Steve Weaver was released entitled Supremely Yours.  Following on the same format as the previous album, all three ladies would have equal number of lead vocals and they'd also share lead vocals on three songs "Stop to Love", "Feel Like Making Love" and another '70s Supremes classic "Touch". Steve recorded over 40 songs with the ladies, most of them now released.

Later in the year of 1995, the ladies were invited to perform with Mel Carter at an engagement, which was recorded and released as 'Mel Carter: Live In Hollywood' and this was released as a CD and DVD.

Exit Sundray, Enter Freddi
Sundray remained with the group for four years, contributing to several albums and establishing herself with fans before being replaced by Freddi Poole. In 1996, Sundray left the trio and Jean Terrell made a brief comeback to the group, reuniting with both Scherrie Payne and Lynda Laurence for two special concerts held at the Industry Cafe in Los Angeles.  This reunion coincided with the recruitment of Freddi Poole in July 1996. Poole, an established singer who had worked with the likes of Patti LaBelle, Gladys Knight and Sammy Davis Jr., stayed with the group until September 2009. Although studio recording was sporadic during her tenure, Freddi contributed to the group's 2006 single “Sisters United (We’re Taking Control)”, the 2007 “Dreamgirls Dance Project” album, and is featured alongside Payne and Laurence on the Former Ladies of The Supremes “20th Anniversary Concert” DVD, recorded live in 2006 and released in 2018 as part of the “Supreme Voices Collection” 2CD/DVD package. She is also featured on live recordings of the soul classics Respect (song) and (You Make Me Feel Like A) Natural Woman.

Exit Freddi, Enter Joyce
On September 29, 2009, it was reported on Scherrie and Lynda's website that Freddi had left the group, later to join another female trio The Three Degrees. With Freddi's departure, Joyce Vincent Wilson of Tony Orlando and Dawn officially joined The Former Ladies. Notably, Vincent had once been considered as a replacement in an official grouping of The Supremes following Mary Wilson's departure; it was later decided by Motown that the group should not continue without an original member, and The Supremes disbanded in 1977.

Exit Lynda, Enter Susaye
On October 6, 2017, it was reported via Facebook that after 31 years Lynda Laurence had departed the group to move into other areas of the music business and was replaced by former Motown Supreme Susaye Greene. Greene was a member of The Supremes from early 1976 to summer of 1977 (replacing Cindy Birdsong), and performed on their last two albums, "High Energy" and "Mary, Scherrie & Susaye".

Keeping the Music Playing – Musical Highlights

In 1996, Jean Terrell returned to the group for several "reunion" shows; this after the departure of Sundray Tucker. Eventually, Freddi Poole joined the group, and Jean departed once again.

1998 - Diana Ross attends the Former Ladies of The Supremes’ show in Las Vegas at the Las Vegas Hilton.  Diana praises the ladies sophisticated show and poses for photos with her “Supreme Sisters.”

In 2000, Scherrie Payne and Lynda Laurence joined Diana Ross on the brief but highly publicized - and later cancelled - Return To Love tour, billed as “Diana Ross & The Supremes”. The group made TV appearances on The Oprah Winfrey Show, The Today Show, VH1 Divas Live, and The View.

In 2001, the FLOS recorded "Light the World (With the Flame of Love)" written by Scherrie and Lynda. The trio performed the anthem at the Small Country Olympics opening ceremony in Italy the same year.

In 2005, the FLOS were honored by the Hollywood History Museum. The museum presented an exhibit showcasing the Ladies' contribution to The Supremes' legacy and their FLOS' history.  Scherrie and Lynda donated stage gowns and shoes from their personal collection for the display along with photos, record albums, tour books, and posters.

In July, 2006, "Sisters United (We're Taking Control)" was debuted at the group's twentieth anniversary concert at The Music Box in Hollywood. Scherrie and Lynda honored all of the Ladies who contributed to the recording and performing success of the Supremes (Diana Ross, Mary Wilson, Florence Ballard, Cindy Birdsong, Jean Terrell, Lynda Laurence, Scherrie Payne, and Susaye Greene – however they forgot to include Barbara Martin, an original member of The Supremes who sang on the group's earliest recordings, but left before their chart success). They presented the Ladies with personalized trophies. In attendance were former Supremes Cindy Birdsong and Susaye Greene, and former FLOS member Sundray Tucker.

In January 2009, Scherrie Payne and Lynda Laurence (with Freddi Poole) rang in the 2009 New Year with a performance in Kuala Lumpur, Malaysia. In August 2009, the Ladies released "Good Intentions", a song produced by Lynda's son Trevor Lawrence and written by Lynda's daughter in-law, Alicia Lawrence.

In November, 2009, The Ladies performed in the Diva's of Motown show in the UK alongside Thelma Houston, Brenda Holloway, Mable John, Chris Clark and Jack Ashford's Funk Brothers

In February, 2010, The Ladies performed at the Second Aid benefit concert for Haiti in Los Angeles, CA. That same month Scherrie and Lynda were honored by the AV Black Chamber of Commerce for Black History Month.

2016 The Former Ladies of The Supremes celebrate their 30th anniversary with a special show at The Catalina Jazz club in Hollywood, CA.  Former Supreme Susaye Greene joined Scherrie, Lynda and Joyce singing "I’m Gonna Let My Heart Do The Walking".

On June 21, 2017, shortly after sound check, Joyce became ill and was admitted to hospital. Scherrie and Lynda continued the show as a duo, marking the first time in over thirty years the group performed with just two members onstage. This would also be Lynda's last performance with The Former Ladies of The Supremes.

December 2018 the new lineup of Scherrie, Susaye & Joyce surprised their fans with the release of their first new music together, the four track Christmas-themed "A Supreme Christmas EP".

January 2019 The Ladies release their first single with Susaye Greene titled "Unconditional Love".  The song was written by Susaye Greene & Jeffrey Chin.

Forty Years Later; Fantasy Becomes Reality
In 1977, when Mary Wilson departed the Supremes for a solo career, it was reported that Scherrie and Susaye would continue the group with a new third member. Scherrie and Susaye had selected Joyce Vincent to round out the trio. Instead, Motown Records decided that without any original members, the Supremes would be disbanded. With the departure of Lynda from the Former Ladies of The Supremes and the addition of Susaye, the "fantasy" line up of Scherrie, Susaye and Joyce has now become reality.

This latest incarnation of the group, now known as “Scherrie & Susaye, Formerly of The Supremes”, continues to tour. In December 2018 the group released their first new music together, the four track Christmas-themed “A Supreme Christmas EP”, followed by the single “Unconditional Love” in 2019. The group are reportedly also completing work on their long-awaited new album, “Supreme Voices II”.

Personnel
Scherrie Payne, Jean Terrell, and Cindy Birdsong (1986)
Scherrie Payne, Lynda Laurence, and Jean Terrell (1986–1992)
Scherrie Payne, Lynda Laurence, and Sundray Tucker (1993–1996)
Scherrie Payne, Lynda Laurence, and Freddi Poole (1996– 2009)
Scherrie Payne, Lynda Laurence, and Joyce Vincent Wilson (2009–2017)
Scherrie Payne, Susaye Greene, and Joyce Vincent Wilson (present)

Discography

Singles
Superstar International Records
"We're Back" /"Get Away" (with Ollie Woodson of The Temptations) (1987)

Motorcity Records
"Crazy About The Guy"/"Crazy About The Guy (Instrumental)" MOTC 13 (1990)
"Stoned Love"/"Crazy About The Guy (live)" MOTC
"I Want To Be Loved"/"I Want To Be Loved (US Remix)" MOTC77 (1991)
"Hit And Miss"/"Hit And Miss (US Remix)" MOTC88 (1991)

Driving Wheel Records
"Stoned Love" DWCD01 (1998)
"Someday We'll Be Together" DWCD02 (1998)

New Material
"Light The World (With The Flame Of Love)" (2000)
"Finally / Good Intentions" (2002)
"Sisters United (We're Taking Control)" (2006)
"Good Intentions" (2009)

Albums
Bouncing Back (scheduled for release on Motorcity Records in 1991 but never issued however its tracks have since appeared on various compilations.)
"Baby Love" (Jean on lead vocals)
"Stop! In the Name of Love" (Scherrie on lead vocals)
"Love Child" (Lynda on lead vocals)
"Crazy About The Guy" (Jean on lead vocals)
"Stoned Love" (Scherrie and Jean on lead vocals)
"I'm Gonna Make You Love Me" (with The Originals)
"I Want To Be Loved" (all three ladies on lead vocals)
"Back By Popular Demand" (with The Originals)
"Hit And Miss" (all three ladies of lead vocals) co-written by Scherrie
"Nathan Jones" (all three leads on unison vocals)
"Your Love Keeps Lifting Me" (with The Originals) co-written by Scherrie

Supreme Voices (1994) – Altair Produced by Rick Gianatos
"How Do You Keep the Music Playing?" – all three ladies on lead vocals
"Rescue Me" – Lynda on lead vocals
"Road To Freedom" – Lynda on lead vocals
"Keep On Loving Me" – Scheerie on lead vocals, co-written by Scherrie
"Give Me The Night" – all three ladies on lead vocals
"Breaking & Entering" – Lynda on lead vocals
"Don't Rock My World" – Scherrie on lead vocals, co-written by Scherrie
"I'm A Fool For Love" – lead vocals by Sundray
"Piano" – Scherrie on lead vocals
"Up the Ladder to the Roof" – all three "ladies" on lead vocals (featuring guest vocalists Cindy Birdsong and Jayne Edwards).
"Somewhere Out There" – Lynda on lead vocals

Supremely Yours (1995) Produced by Steve Weaver
"Feel Like Making Love" – all three ladies share lead vocals
"Who Do You Love" – Scherrie on lead vocals
"Just Like That" – Sundray on lead vocals
"Stop To Love" – all three ladies share lead vocals
"Private Number" (with Edwin Starr) – Lynda on lead vocals
"First Time on A Ferris Wheel" – Scherrie on lead vocals
"Colours of Love" – Lynda on lead vocals
"Stop! I Don't Need No Sympathy" – Sundray on lead vocals
"I Still Believe" – Lynda on lead vocals
"Never Can Say Goodbye" – Sundray on lead vocals
"If I Love Again" – Scherrie on lead vocals
"Sweet Freedom" – Lynda on lead vocals
"Suave" – Lynda on lead vocals (in Spanish)
"Touch" – all three ladies share lead vocals
"Private Number" (with Edwin Starr) Slammin' Jammin' Mix

Reflections (1996) Produced by Steve Weaver
Where Did Our Love Go (1996) Produced by Steve Weaver
Live and More (1997) Produced by Steve Weaver
Legendary Ladies Live (with The Three Degrees and Sister Sledge) (1997) Conceived/Produced by Steve Weaver
Although the three groups above did tour together extensively throughout Europe in 1997 on the same bill, the recordings featured on the above compact disc album were used from three separate projects of previously released live shows from each group, digitally remastered and edited by Steve Weaver.

I Hear a Symphony (1997) Produced by Steve Weaver
Simply Supreme! (1997) Produced by Steve Weaver
Reflections: The Hit List (1998) Produced by Steve Weaver
The Supremes The Hits (HALLMARK MUSIC, 1999) Produced by Steve Weaver

References

External links
Official website
Official Facebook account

American women singers
American girl groups
American rhythm and blues musical groups
The Supremes